Kuzmolovsky is an urban locality (an urban-type settlement) in Vsevolozhsky District of Leningrad Oblast, Russia, located north of the city of Saint Petersburg. Municipally it is incorporated as Kuzmolovskoye Urban Settlement, one of the eight urban settlements in the district. Population:

History
The village of Kuzmolovo was founded in the 19th century. After 1939, it belonged to Pargolovsky District of Leningrad Oblast. On April 3, 1954 Pargolovsky District was abolished, and Kuzmolovo was transferred to Vsevolozhsky District. Intensive construction started in 1953, when the chemical plant was built, and the housing was needed for the workers. On April 21, 1961 Kuzmolovo was granted urban-type settlement status and renamed Kuzmolovsky.

Economy
The economy of the settlement is based on chemical industry.

Transportation

Kuzmolovsky is located on the railroad connecting Saint Petersburg with Sortavala via Priozersk and is served by Kuzmolovo railway platform. There is suburban service from the Finland Station of Saint Petersburg.

Kuzmolovsky is essentially a suburb of Saint Petersburg, and is included in the dense suburban road network.

References

Notes

Sources

Urban-type settlements in Leningrad Oblast